Walthamstow Academy is a mixed secondary school and sixth form located in Walthamstow, London. The school is sponsored by United Learning.

Walthamstow Academy also has a Sixth Form which opened in 2013

References

External links
 School Website
 OFSTED report

Secondary schools in the London Borough of Waltham Forest
United Learning schools
Academies in the London Borough of Waltham Forest
Walthamstow